Ben's Biography is a 2003 Israeli comedy film directed by Dan Wolman. It was entered into the 26th Moscow International Film Festival.

Cast
 Sharon Alexander
 Avigail Ariely
 Rivka Gur
 Ron Gur-Arieh
 Noa Kroll
 Amir Mograbi
 Tahel Ran
 Yossi Tal
 Geni Tamir

References

External links
 

2003 films
2003 comedy films
2000s Hebrew-language films
Films directed by Dan Wolman
Israeli comedy films